Myloplus is a genus of freshwater fish in the family Serrasalmidae found in tropical and subtropical South America, where they inhabit rivers and streams (both slow and fast-flowing). They are primarily herbivores, but also take some animal matter. Adult males have a double-lobed anal fin and filamentous extensions on the dorsal fin, and both sexes (but especially males) can be brightly colored when breeding.

Species
There are currently 15 recognized species in this genus. Many of these were formerly included in Myleus.

 Myloplus arnoldi C. G. E. Ahl, 1936 
 Myloplus asterias (J. P. Müller & Troschel, 1844) 
 Myloplus levis (C. H. Eigenmann & McAtee, 1907)
 Myloplus lobatus (Valenciennes, 1850) 
 Myloplus lucienae M. C. Andrade, Ota, Bastos & Jégu, 2016
 Myloplus nigrolineatus R. P. Ota, V. N. Machado, M. C. Andrade, R. A. Collins, I. P. Farias & Hrbek, 2020
 Myloplus planquettei Jégu, Keith & Le Bail, 2003
 Myloplus rhomboidalis (G. Cuvier, 1818) 
 Myloplus rubripinnis (J. P. Müller & Troschel, 1844) 
 Myloplus schomburgkii (Jardine, 1841) 
 Myloplus ternetzi (Norman, 1929) 
 Myloplus tiete (C. H. Eigenmann & A. A. Norris, 1900) 
 Myloplus torquatus (Kner, 1858)
 Myloplus tumukumak M. C. Andrade, Jégu & Gama, 2018
 Myloplus zorroi M. C. Andrade, Jégu & Giarrizzo, 2016

References

Fish of South America
Serrasalmidae
Taxa named by Theodore Gill
Ray-finned fish genera